The 1958 St. Louis Cardinals season was the team's 77th season in St. Louis, Missouri and its 67th season in the National League. The Cardinals went 72–82 during the season and finished 6th in the National League.

Offseason 
 December 2, 1957: 1957 minor league draft
Ellis Burton was drafted by the Cardinals from the Pittsburgh Pirates.
Lee Tate was drafted by the Cardinals from the San Francisco Giants.
 December 5, 1957: Marty Kutyna, Ted Wieand, and Willard Schmidt were traded by the Cardinals to the Cincinnati Redlegs for Curt Flood and Joe Taylor.

Regular season 
Third baseman Ken Boyer won a Gold Glove this year.

Season standings

Record vs. opponents

Notable transactions 
 April 2, 1958: Jim King was traded by the Cardinals to the San Francisco Giants for Ray Katt.
 April 19, 1958: Phil Paine was selected off waivers by the Cardinals from the Milwaukee Braves.
 May 20, 1958: Alvin Dark was traded by the Cardinals to the Chicago Cubs for Jim Brosnan.
 June 15, 1958: Dick Schofield and cash were traded by the Cardinals to the Pittsburgh Pirates for Johnny O'Brien and Gene Freese.
 July 2, 1958: Morrie Martin was selected off waivers from the Cardinals by the Cleveland Indians.
 September 29, 1958: Gene Freese was traded by the Cardinals to the Philadelphia Phillies for Solly Hemus.

Roster

Player stats

Batting

Starters by position 
Note: Pos = Position; G = Games played; AB = At bats; H = Hits; Avg. = Batting average; HR = Home runs; RBI = Runs batted in

Other batters 
Note: G = Games played; AB = At bats; H = Hits; Avg. = Batting average; HR = Home runs; RBI = Runs batted in

Pitching

Starting pitchers 
Note: G = Games pitched; IP = Innings pitched; W = Wins; L = Losses; ERA = Earned run average; SO = Strikeouts

Other pitchers 
Note: G = Games pitched; IP = Innings pitched; W = Wins; L = Losses; ERA = Earned run average; SO = Strikeouts

Relief pitchers 
Note: G = Games pitched; W = Wins; L = Losses; SV = Saves; ERA = Earned run average; SO = Strikeouts

Farm system 

LEAGUE CHAMPIONS: Nuevo Laredo, Dothan

References

External links 
1958 St. Louis Cardinals at Baseball Reference
1958 St. Louis Cardinals team page at www.baseball-almanac.com

St. Louis Cardinals seasons
Saint Louis Cardinals season
St. Louis Cardinals